A billiard ball is a small, hard ball used in cue sports, such as carom billiards, pool, and snooker. The number, type, diameter, color, and pattern of the balls differ depending upon the specific game being played. Various particular ball properties such as hardness, friction coefficient, and resilience are important to accuracy.

History

Early balls were made of various materials, including wood and clay (the latter remaining in use well into the 20th century). Although affordable ox-bone balls were in common use in Europe, elephant ivory was favored since at least 1627 until the early 20th century; the earliest known written reference to ivory billiard balls is in the 1588 inventory of the Duke of Norfolk. Dyed and numbered balls appeared around the early 1770s. By the mid-19th century, elephants were being slaughtered for their ivory at an alarming rate, just to keep up with the demand for high-end billiard balls – no more than eight balls could be made from a single elephant's tusks. The billiard industry realized that the supply of elephants (their primary source of ivory) was endangered, as well as dangerous to obtain (the latter an issue of notable public concern at the turn of the 19th century). Inventors were challenged to come up with an alternative material that could be manufactured, with a US$10,000 (worth approximately $ in ) prize being offered by a New York supplier.

Although not the first artificial substance to be used for the balls (e.g. Sorel cement, invented in 1867, was marketed as an artificial ivory), John Wesley Hyatt invented a composition material in 1869 called nitrocellulose for billiard balls (US patent 50359, the first American patent for billiard balls). It is unclear if the cash prize was ever awarded, and there is no evidence suggesting he did in fact win it. By 1870 it was commercially branded Celluloid, the first industrial plastic. However, the nature of celluloid made it volatile in production, occasionally exploding, which ultimately made this early plastic impractical. Subsequently, to avoid the problem of celluloid instability, the industry experimented with various other synthetic materials for billiard balls such as Bakelite, acrylic, and other plastic compounds.

The exacting requirements of the billiard ball are met today with balls cast from plastic materials that are strongly resistant to cracking and chipping. Currently Saluc, under the brand name Aramith and other private labels, manufactures phenolic resin balls. Other plastics and resins such as polyester (similar to those used for bowling balls) and clear acrylic are also used.

Ivory balls remained in use in artistic billiards competition until the late 20th century.

Types

Carom billiards

In the realm of carom billiards games, three balls are used to play most games on pocketless billiards tables. They are typically colored as follows:
 White:  for player 1
 Yellow or white with a spot: cue ball for player 2
 Red (occasionally blue):  (four-ball uses an extra object ball.)

Pool

Pool balls are used to play various pool games, such as eight-ball, nine-ball, and straight pool. These balls, the most widely used throughout the world, are smaller than carom billiards balls, and larger than those for snooker.

The balls are numbered and colored as in the table. The 8 ball is not considered part of either suit. Striped balls were introduced around 1889. 

Rotation games do not distinguish between solids and stripes, but rather use the numbering on the balls to determine which  must be pocketed. In other games such as straight pool neither type of marking is of any consequence. 

Some balls used in televised pool games are colored differently in order to make them more distinguishable on television monitors. Most commonly, the dark purple used on the 4 and 12 balls is replaced by pink to make it easier to distinguish the 4 from the black 8 ball, and similarly the 7 and 15 balls use a lighter brown color instead of a deep maroon. Other, less common color substitutions are also found, dependent on manufacturer. These sets often have a cue ball with multiple spots on its surface so that  placed on it is evident to viewers.

Coin-operated pool tables, such as those found at bowling alleys, arcades, or bars, may use a slightly different-sized cue ball, so that the cue ball can be separated from object balls by the table's ball return mechanism and delivered into its own ball return. Such different sized cue balls are considered less than ideal because they change the dynamics of the equipment. Other tables use a system where a magnet pulls a cue ball with a thin layer of metal embedded inside away from the object ball collection chamber and into the cue ball return, allowing the cue ball to more closely match the object balls in size and weight. More recently, optical systems that recognize the cue ball, which is more translucent than the other balls due to its solid white color, and separate it mechanically have been developed.

Blackball pool

Aside from the 8, shots are not  since there is no reliable way to identify particular balls to be pocketed. Because they are unnumbered, they are wholly unsuited to certain pool games, such as nine-ball, in which ball order is important. The yellow-and-red sets are sometimes referred to as "casino sets" as they were developed to make identification of suits easier for spectators at eight-ball championships often held in casinos. Such sets were sold by the Brunswick–Balke–Collender Co. as early as 1908. Similar to standard pool balls, there are also special sets designed for televised games; these sets have a black-striped 8 ball, and a spotted cue ball.

Snooker

Ball sets for snooker consist of twenty-two balls in total, arranged as a rack of 15 unmarked red balls, six  placed at various predetermined spots on the table, and a white cue ball. The colour balls are sometimes numbered with their point values in the style of pool balls for the home market.

Snooker sets are also available with considerably smaller-than-regulation balls (and even with ten instead of fifteen reds) for play on smaller tables (down to half-size), and are sanctioned for use in some amateur leagues. Sets for American snooker are typically , with numbered colour balls.

The set of eight colours used for snooker balls (including white) are thought to be derived from croquet, which uses the same set of colors. Snooker was invented in 1884 by British Army officers stationed in India. Croquet reached its peak popularity at the same time, particularly among people in the same social context. There are many other similarities between croquet and snooker, which when taken together, suggest that the derivation of the latter owes much to the existence of the former.

Other games

Various other games have their own variants of billiard balls. English billiards uses the same number of balls as carom billiards, but the same size as snooker balls, as the game is played on the same size table as snooker.

Kaisa has the same pocket and ball dimensions but uses only five balls: one yellow, two red and two white cue balls, one for each player.

Bumper pool requires four white and four red object balls, and two special balls, one red with a white spot and the other white with red spot; all are usually  in diameter. Bar billiards uses six or seven white balls (depending on regional variations) and one red ball  in diameter.

Novelty balls

There is a market for specialty cue balls and even entire ball sets, featuring sports team logos, cartoon characters, animal pelt patterns, or other non-standard decorations.

Entrepreneurial inventors also supply a variety of novelty billiard games with unique rules and balls, some with playing card markings, others with stars and stripes, and yet others in sets of more than thirty balls in several suits. Marbled-looking and glittery materials are also popular for home tables. There are even blacklight sets for playing in near-dark. There are also practical joke cue and 8 balls, with off-center weights in them that make their paths curve and wobble. Even an egg-shaped ball has been patented and marketed under such names as Bobble Ball and Tag Ball.

In popular culture

The 8 ball is frequently used in Western, especially American, culture as an element of T-shirt designs, album covers and names, tattoos, household goods like paperweights and cigarette lighters, belt buckles, etc. A classic toy is the Magic 8-Ball "oracle".

It has also been used to refer to African-Americans, particularly those of darker skin tones, as in the film Full Metal Jacket. The expression "behind the eight [ball]" is used to indicate a dilemma from which it is difficult to extricate oneself. The term derives from the game kelly pool.

Because the collisions between billiard balls are nearly elastic, and the balls roll on a surface that produces low rolling friction, their behavior is often used to illustrate Newton's laws of motion. Idealized, frictionless billiard balls are a staple of mathematical theorems and physics models, and figure in dynamical billiards, scattering theory, Lissajous knots, billiard ball computing, and reversible cellular automata, Polchinski's paradox, contact dynamics, collision detection, the illumination problem, atomic ultracooling, quantum mirages, and elsewhere in these fields.

"Billiard balls" or "pool balls" is the name given to balls used in stage magic tricks, especially the classic "multiplying billiard balls". Though obviously derived from real billiard balls, today they are usually smaller, for easier manipulation and hiding, but not so small and light that they are difficult to juggle, as the magic and juggling disciplines have often overlapped since their successful combination by pioneers like Paul Vandy.

The phrase "as smooth as a billiard ball" is sometimes applied to describe a bald person, and the term "cue ball" is also slang for someone who sports a shaved head. An urban legend received cultural attention to many saying, "If the Earth were the size of a billiard ball, it would be smoother". It was used in 2008's Discover Magazine stating no diameter variations measuring +/-0.005" should be made, but mistook the diameter tolerance for smoothness. If the Earth were reduced to the size of a billiard ball, its mountains and trenches would equal the texture of 320 grit sandpaper and the variation in diameter would be 0.0049", which is near the maximum diameter tolerance. (see also: Earth's shape)

References

Patents
 —Billiard ball 
 —Billiard ball 
 —Billiard ball 
 —Billiard ball 

Ball, billiard
Balls